Kanzaki District is associated with:

 Kanzaki District, Saga
 Kanzaki District, Hyogo
 Kanzaki District, Shiga

See also
Kanzaki (disambiguation)